The 2014 Winter Paralympics Torch Relay was a 10-day event leading up to the 2014 Winter Paralympic Games in Sochi. It began on February 26, 2014, in Cape Dezhnyov and concluded at the Games' opening ceremony on March 7. It is held entirely within Russia, the host country

Route

Torchbearers

See also
 2008 Summer Paralympics torch relay
 2010 Winter Paralympics torch relay
 2012 Summer Paralympics torch relay

References

Torch relay
Paralympic torch relays